Benjamin Vadnai (born 30 December 1995) is a Hungarian competitive sailor. He competed at the 2016 Summer Olympics in Rio de Janeiro, in the men's Laser class.

References

External links
 
 
 

1995 births
Living people
Olympic sailors of Hungary
Sailors at the 2016 Summer Olympics – Laser
Sailors at the 2020 Summer Olympics – Laser

Hungarian male sailors (sport)